William H. Vincent House is a historic home located at Capron, Southampton County, Virginia. It was built in 1889, and is a two-story Queen Anne style frame dwelling.  It features a cross gable roof, tower, modillioned cornice and wrap-around porch. The porch incorporates a corner gazebo topped with a conical tin roof. Also on the property are the contributing two-room office building, a playhouse, a barn, and the Ambrose House.

It was listed on the National Register of Historic Places in 2004.

References

Houses on the National Register of Historic Places in Virginia
Queen Anne architecture in Virginia
Houses completed in 1889
Houses in Southampton County, Virginia
National Register of Historic Places in Southampton County, Virginia